
The Peabody Downtown Historic District is a historic district which was listed on the National Register of Historic Places (NRHP) in 1998.  It is located in Peabody, Kansas.

Significant contributing buildings in the district include:
City Building (1886)
Old Peabody Library (separately NRHP-listed)
Peabody Township Carnegie Library (separately NRHP-listed)
Morgan House (1881) (separately NRHP-listed)
Kansas State Bank Building (1887)

Gallery

See also

 National Register of Historic Places listings in Marion County, Kansas
 Peabody Historical Library Museum
 Peabody Township Library
 W.H. Morgan House
 J.S. Schroeder Building
 Sunflower Theater
 Charles W. Squires

References

Further reading

External links

Peabody Downtown Historic District
 
 
Maps
 Peabody City Map, KDOT

Historic districts on the National Register of Historic Places in Kansas
Geography of Marion County, Kansas
National Register of Historic Places in Marion County, Kansas